No. 1 Squadron (The Tigers), the oldest squadron of the Indian Air Force operates as a multirole (air superiority and electronic warfare) unit. Part of 40 Wing of the Indian Air Force under Central Air Command, it is based at Maharajpur in Gwalior.

History
The squadron was established at Drigh Road, Karachi on 1 April 1933, with four Westland Wapitis and five pilots: the sixth was deemed too short. The pilots included Subroto Mukerjee.

The squadron successfully test fired a BVR MICA missile from a Mirage-2000 aircraft on 24 September 2016.

Aircraft

Commemorative Postal Stamp
Commemorative stamp was released by India Post in 1993.

References

001
Gwalior
Military units and formations of India in World War II
1933 establishments in India